Grallaricula is a genus of bird in the family Grallariidae.

It contains the following ten species:
 Ochre-breasted antpitta, Grallaricula flavirostris
 Rusty-breasted antpitta, Grallaricula ferrugineipectus
 Rufous-breasted antpitta, Grallaricula leymebambae
 Scallop-breasted antpitta, Grallaricula loricata
 Hooded antpitta, Grallaricula cucullata
 Peruvian antpitta, Grallaricula peruviana
 Ochre-fronted antpitta, Grallaricula ochraceifrons
 Slaty-crowned antpitta, Grallaricula nana
 Crescent-faced antpitta, Grallaricula lineifrons
 Sucre antpitta, Grallaricula cumanensis

 
Bird genera
Taxa named by Philip Sclater
Taxonomy articles created by Polbot